Matías Soto (born 27 April 1999) is a Chilean tennis player.

Soto has a career high ATP singles ranking of No. 525 achieved on 15 August 2022. He also has a career high ATP doubles ranking of No. 290 achieved on 6 March 2023.

Soto made his ATP main draw debut in doubles at the 2023 Chile Open after receiving a wildcard with Thiago Seyboth Wild, where he notched his first career ATP tour-level win in doubles, and after two more wins, he reached his first career ATP doubles final. As a result he reached the top 300 in the doubles rankings.

Soto has been nominated to represent Chile at the Davis Cup on multiple occasions, but he has not participated in a match yet. He also played college tennis at Baylor University.

ATP career finals

Doubles: 1 (1 runner-up)

ATP Challenger and ITF World Tennis Tour finals

Singles: 3 (2–1)

Doubles: 4 (1–3)

References

External links

1999 births
Living people
Chilean male tennis players
People from Copiapó
Baylor Bears men's tennis players